The wushu competition at the 2009 World Games was held from July 16 to July 26 at the Kaohsiung County Stadium in Kaohsiung, Taiwan. This was the first time wushu was featured as an invitational sport at the games, with later appearances being in 2013 and 2022.

Medal summary

Medal table

Taolu

Sanda

References 

Wushu at the 2009 World Games
World Games
Wushu at the World Games